Léon Kauffman (16 August 1869 – 25 March 1952) was a Luxembourgish politician. He was the 12th Prime Minister of Luxembourg, serving for one year, from 18 June 1917 until 28 September 1918.

After studying law, in 1893 Kauffman was appointed an Attaché of the Parquet Général, and then was a justice of the peace in Echternach from 1898 to 1900. Then he was a senior civil servant from 1902 to 1910. In 1910 he became director of the tax administration and president of the Assurances sociales. In 1916 he became Director-General (Minister) of Finance, until 1918. In 1917 there was a crisis within the Thorn Ministry, as the Chamber of Deputies had withdrawn confidence from agriculture minister Michel Welter.

On 19 June 1917 Kauffman put together a Right-Liberal government, in which he was prime minister, as well as the Foreign and Finance Minister. Under this government, changes to the constitution were put into motion which were to introduce universal suffrage. There were disagreements, however, as the government refused, as the Chamber demanded, to establish the origins of sovereign power "in the nation," instead of "in the person of the Grand Duke", as hitherto. When it became known that the prime minister had been present at a private visit of the German chancellor Georg von Hertling to Grand Duchess Marie-Adélaïde on 16 August 1918, the government was reformed. Léon Kauffman resigned as prime minister on 28 September 1918. From 1915 to 1945 he was a member, and from 1945 to 1952 he was president of the Council of State. From 1923 to 1952, he was president of the executive board of the Banque Internationale à Luxembourg.

He died in 1952 in Luxembourg City.

He was married to Madeleine Joséphine Franck, and had one son.

Footnotes

References 
 

|-

|-

|-

Ministers for Finances of Luxembourg
Prime Ministers of Luxembourg
Ministers for Foreign Affairs of Luxembourg
Presidents of the Council of State of Luxembourg
Members of the Chamber of Deputies (Luxembourg)
Members of the Council of State of Luxembourg
Party of the Right (Luxembourg) politicians
Luxembourgian bankers
Luxembourgian people of World War I
1869 births
1952 deaths
People from Luxembourg City